Crime File is a 1999 Indian Malayalam-language action crime thriller film by K. Madhu starring Suresh Gopi, Siddique and Sangita Madhavan Nair. The film is loosely based on the 1992 murder of Sister Abhaya in Kerala.

Plot
Sister Amala, a nun, is found dead in the well of the convent where she was staying. The police discover that she was murdered. Idamattom Palackal Easo Panickar  and his team find out the truth behind Sr. Amala's murder. The suspects include Fr. Clement Kaliyar and the local legislator Monayi, and a hitman - Cardinal Carlos. 

Things get worse when Fr. Kaliyar and one of the police officers, Ezhuthachan, are killed.
Then, Easow Panickar arrests, the collector Paul Varghese, with the support of the Chief Minister. On torturing and questioning him, he arrests the MLA Monayi. Later, the hitman Cardinal Carlos is taken into custody too.

Cast

References

External links
 

1990s Malayalam-language films
1990s crime action films
1999 crime thriller films
1999 action thriller films
1999 films
Films about organised crime in India
Fictional portrayals of the Kerala Police
Crime films based on actual events
Indian crime thriller films
Indian crime action films
Indian action thriller films
Films shot in Alappuzha
Films directed by K. Madhu